Lake Chesdin (also known as Chesdin Reservoir) is a lake in south-central Virginia, on the border of Chesterfield County and Dinwiddie County and going upstream into Amelia County.  It provides water and power to the region.  It is also a popular fishing area and is known to have great opportunities for largemouth bass.  It is also known to have populations of crappie, bluegill, walleye, striped bass, channel catfish, gizzard shad and white perch.

Location
Today, the dam and the reservoir are located in the Appomattox watershed at the political boundary of Chesterfield, Amelia, and Dinwiddie Counties. The boundary between Chesterfield and Dinwiddie Counties divides the dam and the reservoir into two almost equal halves. The crest of the dam is about 840 feet long, and the reservoir has a drainage area of about 1,333 square miles.

History
Lake Chesdin Reservoir was created in 1968 by construction of the George F. Brasfield Dam on the Appomattox River.  Lake Chesdin was built to supply water to Dinwiddie, Prince George and Chesterfield counties, along with the cities of Colonial Heights and Petersburg. In the fall of 1960, these five municipal governments in the Petersburg tri-cities area came together to pass an ordinance establishing the Appomattox River Water Authority (ARWA).

Once the dam project was completed in 1967, the river's flow filled the pool behind it to create Lake Chesdin.

Regional importance
The Dam is overseen by the ARWA. Based on the last yield study  the total storage volume of Lake Chesdin was 9.66 billion gallons (BG) with a safe yield of approximately 41.3 million gallons per day (mgd).
To provide  a municipal water supply, the city of Petersburg, Virginia purchases water from ARWA. Since Lake Chesdin was built in the late 1960s, silt buildup on its bottom has reduced the amount of water the lake can hold by one-and-a-half billion gallons. In addition, a run-of-river hydroelectric facility is located at the dam, which involves power generation whenever the flow over the spillway exceeds 150 cfs or 1-1/4" flow depth over the spillway.

Fishing

Largemouth bass 

Lake Chesdin is known as an excellent fishery for largemouth bass.

Crappie 

Lake Chesdin is home to both varieties of crappie found in Virginia. Though the crappie population has been declining, due to increased competition for food with white perch, some exceed . The lake record was caught April 19, 2001. Angler....David Collins. DeWitt, Va

Bluegill 

Bluegill are also commonly found in Lake Chesdin, but due to competition for food from other species, few exceed .

Walleye 

Though walleye are not stocked often in Lake Chesdin, it has some up to and exceeding .

Striped bass 

One of Lake Chesdin's most notable species of fish is the striped bass, with some reaching .  They are regularly stocked.

Channel catfish 

Lake Chesdin has a great population of channel catfish.  These catfish can be found in abundance in the lake ranging from 2 to 6 lb.

White perch 

There is an abundance of white perch in the lake.

References

Bodies of water of Amelia County, Virginia
Bodies of water of Chesterfield County, Virginia
Bodies of water of Dinwiddie County, Virginia
Chesdin